MAPK-interacting and spindle-stabilizing protein-like is a protein that in humans is encoded by the MAPK1IP1L gene.

References

External links

Further reading